Richard Clement Wade (July 14, 1921 in Des Moines, Iowa – July 18, 2008 in Manhattan, New York) was an American historian and urban studies professor who advised many Democratic politicians and candidates, including Adlai Stevenson, Robert F. Kennedy and George McGovern. As a historian, he pioneered the interdisciplinary application of social science techniques to the study of urban history and helped make cities an important academic subject.  His first book The Urban Frontier (1959) was a challenge to Frederick Jackson Turner's Frontier thesis, asserting that the catalysts for western expansion were the Western cities like Pittsburgh, Louisville, and Cincinnati, not the pioneer farmers.

Life
Wade was born in Des Moines but grew up in Winnetka, Illinois, a wealthy suburb of Chicago, where his father practiced law.  He attended New Trier High School there, where he played championship-level tennis.

Wade earned bachelor's and master's degrees in history at the University of Rochester and also competed in basketball, track and field and baseball.

After receiving his doctorate at Harvard University in 1956, Wade taught at Rochester and at Washington University in St. Louis before moving to the University of Chicago in 1963.

In 1971 Wade was named a distinguished professor of history at CUNY's Graduate Center.

In 1991 Wade was appointed chairman of New York State's Commission on Libraries by Gov. Mario M. Cuomo.

Wade was a co-founder and the first president of the Urban History Association.  "He started a movement," said his former student
Kenneth T. Jackson.  "There are hundreds of books on cities now, and in a sense he is their grandfather.  The only reason I took urban history was because of him; I had never heard of such a thing."

Wade was a close friend of Arthur Schlesinger, Jr., with whom he shared an office at the Graduate Center.  He moved easily in the higher circles of Democratic Party politics.

In 1974-1975 Wade was the Harold Vyvyan Harmsworth Professor of American History at Oxford University.

His marriages to Louise Carroll Wade of Eugene, Oregon, and Cynthia Hyla Whittaker of Manhattan, New York ended in divorce.  He was survived by his wife, the former Liane Wood-Thomas.

He died at his home in Roosevelt Island in Manhattan, New York.

Views
In The Urban Frontier, Wade summarized the claims that scholars had made for the importance of the city in American history.  The cities were the focal points for the growth of the West, especially those along the Ohio River and Mississippi River.  The cities, especially Boston were the seedbeds of the American Revolution.  The rivalry between cities, such as between Baltimore and Philadelphia, or between Chicago and St. Louis, stimulated economic innovations and growth, especially regarding the railroads.  The failure of the South to develop an urban infrastructure significantly weakened it during the American Civil War, especially after its border cities of Baltimore, Washington, Louisville, and St. Louis refused to join the Confederacy.  The cities were fonts of innovation in democracy, especially in terms of building powerful political organizations and machines; they were also the main base for reformers of what those machines built, becoming the home base for important immigrant groups, especially the Irish and the Jews.  Cities were the strongholds of labor unions in the 19th and 20th centuries (although no longer true in the 21st century).  See Richard Wade, "The City in History: Some American Perspectives," in Werner Z. Hirsch, ed., Urban Life and Form (1963) pp. 59–77. In "Slavery in the Cities" Wade undermined a common understanding that slavery is a purely agrarian labor system emphasizing the importance of the South’s commercial cities.

Works
The Urban Frontier: The Rise of Western Cities, 1790-1830 (1959) read online
Slavery in the Cities: The South, 1820-1860 (1964)
Chicago: Growth of a Metropolis (1973) (with Harold Melvin Mayer)

References

1921 births
2008 deaths
20th-century American historians
American male non-fiction writers
University of Rochester faculty
University of Chicago faculty
City University of New York faculty
Washington University in St. Louis faculty
University of Rochester alumni
Harvard University alumni
Writers from Des Moines, Iowa
Urban historians
Harold Vyvyan Harmsworth Professors of American History
Historians from Iowa
20th-century American male writers